Parrot is the surname of:

 André Parrot (1901–1980), French archaeologist
 Carl Parrot (1867–1911), German physician and ornithologist
 Friedrich Parrot (1791–1841), Baltic German naturalist, explorer and mountaineer
 Georg Friedrich Parrot (1767–1852), Estonian scientist
 Jean-Claude Parrot (born 1937), Canadian union leader
 Kent Kane Parrot (1880–1956), American politician
 Philippe Parrot (1831–1894), French painter
 William Parrot (1878–1952), birth name of English music hall performer who used the stage name Talbot O'Farrell

See also
 Parrott (surname)